Rhyzodiastes costatus is a species of ground beetle in the subfamily Rhysodinae. It was described by Louis Alexandre Auguste Chevrolat in 1829. It is found in Brazil.

References

Rhyzodiastes
Beetles of South America
Beetles described in 1829
Taxa named by Louis Alexandre Auguste Chevrolat